Zameen is a 2003 Indian Hindi-language action thriller film directed by Rohit Shetty in his directorial debut. The film stars Ajay Devgn, Abhishek Bachchan and Bipasha Basu. The movie did average business at the box office.

The plot of Zameen is loosely based upon the Indian Airlines Flight 814 hijacking though more closely represents the rescue mission taken by the Israeli Defense Forces (IDF) in 1976 at Entebbe, Uganda where the IDF rescued 102 hostages taken by the PFLP-EO and the West German group Revolutionary Cells.

Plot
Terrorists, backed by Pakistan, boldly attack the Indian Parliament building. The Indian Army assigns this matter to Colonel Ranvir Singh Ranawat (Ajay Devgn), who along with his men, apprehends and arrests the ring-leader Baba Zaheer Khan (Mukesh Tiwari). The Colonel takes one of his subordinates, Jaideep Rai (Abhishek Bachchan) to task, as nine soldiers were killed due to his negligence and asks him to resign. A terrorist group, Al-Tahir, recruits a group of men to try to evacuate their leader Baba Zaheer from Army prison, albeit in vain as their plans are thwarted by Jaideep, who is now an Assistant Commissioner of Police (ACP) in the Anti-Terrorist Squad (ATS) in Mumbai city. ACP Jaideep summons a usual suspect named Fareed (Sanjay Mishra), who is a Garage owner for the vehicles recovered from the teo release their leader Baba Zaheer in lieu of the lives of all 107 on-board passengers. Presence of the professor, and throws his dead body into the sea. The professor bribes two corrupt officials of the Mumbai Airport to sneak in Guns inside the flight as they never go through the security checks. In a cross-fire between Mumbai ATS, ACP Jilitants' gets the police, this group hijacks an Indian Airlines plane, en route from Mumbai to Kathmandu, with Jaideep's fianceè, Nandini (Bipasha Basu), an in-flight supervisor, and Captain Basheer Ali (Pankaj Dheer), ACP Jaideep's foster father on board. The plane, with 107 passengers and crew, is re-routed to Kazan in Pakistan-administered Kashmir where they are met with more armed terrorists as well as the Pakistani Army. Together, they demand the release of Baba Zaheer in exchange for the lives of the passengers. ACP Jaideep soon recollects from his last conversation over the phone with Nandini that one of the two airports ground-staff did not leave the flight till the last moment of its departure. Jaideep apprehends him to which he confesses of sneaking in guns and other ammunition into the flight. The Indian Government makes a failed attempt to convince the Pakistani Ambassador (Arun Bali) to either send the Pakistani Army or let the Indian Army enter Pakistan-controlled Kashmir to rescue the civilians on board the flight. The Army and the Indian police collaborate and both Ranvir and Jaideep are asked to work together. Ranvir is weary of Jaideep's capabilities, since Jaideep is investigating Ranvir and his men — who are suspected of supplying arms and ammunitions to terrorists and Pakistanis. The duo nevertheless works out a plan to free the hostages and apprehend the terrorists. What they do not know is that their plan has already been compromised, and they may well be headed to their respective deaths. After a major gun-battle, Ranvir and Jaideep manage to capture Baba Zaheer again only to throw him out of a flying Army helicopter, after the flight has taken off from Kazaan in Pakistan-administered Kashmir.

Cast
Ajay Devgn as Col. Ranvir Singh Ranawat
Abhishek Bachchan as ACP Jaideep "Jai" Rai IPS, an Ex-Captain in Indian Army
Bipasha Basu as Nandini Rai, Jai's fianceè
Pankaj Dheer as Captain Basheer Ali (Pilot), Jai's foster father
Kunwar Aziz as a Terrorist
Mukesh Tiwari as Baba Zaheer Khan, leader of Al-Tahir
Mohan Joshi as Brigadier Malik, Ranvir's senior officer
Sanjay Mishra as henchman Fareed
Kamal Chopra as Commissioner of Police
 Manish Khanna as Professor Santhanam
D. Santosh as COP Kadam
Jasbir Thandi as Army officer who recognises the militants
Subrat Dutta as Major Puri
Eijaz Khan in a special appearance in "Dilli Ki Sardi"
Amrita Arora as an item number "Dilli Ki Sardi"
Ram Awana as Terrorist
Mohit Chauhan as Terrorist
Arun Bali as the Pakistani ambassador to India
 Rajendra Sethi as Pakistan ISI Chief
Ahmad Harhash as Baby Raj Mishra

Soundtrack

The soundtrack was directed and composed by Himesh Reshammiya, while Sameer wrote the lyrics. The music was released by T-Series.

References

External links
 
 

2000s Hindi-language films
2003 action thriller films
2003 directorial debut films
2003 films
Fictional portrayals of the Maharashtra Police
Films about aircraft hijackings
Films about aviation accidents or incidents
Films about terrorism in India
Films directed by Rohit Shetty
Films scored by Himesh Reshammiya
Films set on airplanes
Indian Army in films
Indian aviation films
Indian action thriller films
Indian films based on actual events
Kashmir conflict in films
Military of Pakistan in films
Operation Entebbe
Films set in Azad Kashmir
2000 millennium attack plots
Films about jihadism
India–Pakistan relations in popular culture